Joshua Charles Malina (born January 17, 1966) is an American film and stage actor known for playing Will Bailey on the NBC drama The West Wing, Jeremy Goodwin on Sports Night, US Attorney General David Rosen on Scandal, and Caltech President Siebert on The Big Bang Theory.

Early life and education
Malina was born in New York City. His parents, Fran and Robert Malina, were founding members of Young Israel of Scarsdale in New Rochelle, where he grew up. His father was an attorney, investment banker and Broadway producer. The actor has commented that while the name "Malina" does not sound Jewish to most people and often leads them to assume he is Latino (often due to confusion of "Malina" with the Spanish surname Molina), the name is Czech in origin, from the "Czech [word] for 'raspberry.'"

Malina attended middle school at Westchester Day School and high school at the Horace Mann School. He earned a B.A. in Theater from Yale University. At Yale, he was a member of The Spizzwinks, an a cappella group, together with fellow actor Noah Emmerich.

Career

Theatre
He made his acting debut in the Broadway production of Aaron Sorkin's A Few Good Men, and later in the play's run moved into a major role. Malina had contacted Sorkin initially at the suggestion of his parents when he first went to New York City, as they knew Sorkin was a high-school classmate and friend of Malina's cousins. The cousins, in turn, had spoken highly of Malina to Sorkin, who suggested he audition for the play. Malina has joked in interviews that Sorkin's casting him in subsequent productions may owe to the fact that he once performed the Heimlich maneuver on Sorkin, saving his life, when the writer began to choke while eating a hamburger at a bowling match with the cast of the play. He has since appeared in many Sorkin film and TV projects.

Film and television
Malina's first job in the film business was as a production assistant on the Chevy Chase comedy Fletch Lives, an ill-received sequel to the star's hit movie Fletch. His first on-screen appearance was a three-line, five-word role in the film version of A Few Good Men, where he has said he appreciated the dedication that star Jack Nicholson showed by performing his lines in the scene himself even though his character was off screen and could easily have been played for him by a crew member. In his next film, Sorkin's The American President, Malina had a somewhat larger role as assistant to Annette Bening's environmental-activist character.

Malina played two different characters over four episodes on the talk-show satire The Larry Sanders Show. He appeared first in 1993 as Robert Brody, a fictional reporter for the real-life magazine Entertainment Weekly, to whom actor John Ritter gives a scathing interview after having his appearance in the show cancelled to make room for musician Warren Zevon to play a second song (episode: "Off Camera"). Five years later, Malina returned in a recurring role as Kenny Mitchell, a sleazy network executive who pushes Larry Sanders out of the show in favor of Jon Stewart.

From 1998 to 2000, Malina starred as character Jeremy Goodwin on Sorkin's Sports Night, a show that attracted him from the moment Sorkin sent him the pilot script. The Goodwin character began as a research analyst, but was promoted to associate producer by the second season, creating a larger role for Malina. The critically acclaimed show was unable to find a large fan base and was canceled after two seasons, with some critics saying the show's troubles were exacerbated by having to share Sorkin's time with his concurrent project on rival network NBC, The West Wing. The actor counts Sports Night among his most popular roles and noted on the occasion of the show's 10th-anniversary DVD release, "If my straw poll of who stops me to say what is any indication, West Wing may only slightly edge Sports Night."

Following the panned Hank Azaria vehicle Imagine That – where both he and Azaria were described as "talent going to waste" – Malina played Will Bailey on The West Wing from 2002 to 2006. His character initially was perceived by the public as an attempt to replace departing series star Rob Lowe, although Malina said in numerous interviews that the two actors and characters were too dissimilar to be viewed as anything but a change. During his tenure on The West Wing, Malina was known to the rest of the cast as a tireless prankster. It is said he coated telephones with Vaseline and reset producer Alex Graves's iPod menus to Mandarin Chinese.
He stole some of Bradley Whitford's letterhead stationery and used it in an elaborate prank. At the suggestion of co-star Janel Moloney, Malina sent a $200 Valentine's Day bouquet to season-six newcomer Jimmy Smits that included a card crafted on Whitford's stolen letterhead stating: "Jimmy, You are a delight. I enjoyed every moment we've had together. Be my Valentine." Following the end of The West Wing, Malina campaigned for the leading role of Danny Tripp in Sorkin's next TV project, Studio 60 On the Sunset Strip, but the role went instead to Whitford. When the show was cancelled in its first season, Malina was teased by some in the industry who suggested he was Sorkin's good luck charm, but he pointed to Sorkin's upcoming film Charlie Wilson's War as evidence his friend could succeed without him.

In 2007, Malina became one of the four stars of the short-lived ABC dramedy Big Shots. His character, Karl Mixworthy, was a pharmaceutical company executive juggling a wife and a mistress, who meet when the jilted lover tries to expose him to his wife but befriends her instead.

Malina is a co-creator and producer of Bravo's cable TV series Celebrity Poker Showdown. In private life, he is an avid poker player, having played with Sorkin while on Broadway, used poker winnings to pay his rent early in his career, and organized a cast-and-crew game that lasted the full duration of Sports Night and occasionally delayed the start of shooting. The idea for the show came from a weekly high-stakes poker game hosted by Hank Azaria, which Malina and friend Andrew Hill Newman attended.

From 2011 to 2019, Malina appeared as University President Siebert on The Big Bang Theory.

In 2012, Malina held a recurring role on ABC's Scandal as Assistant U.S. Attorney David Rosen. He was promoted to a series regular for season 2.

Malina co-hosted the podcast The West Wing Weekly with Hrishikesh Hirway. The series debuted in March 2016, and ended in January 2020.

Philanthropy
In 2004, Malina was a participant in the first-ever national television advertising campaign supporting donations to Jewish federations. The program featured "film and television personalities celebrating their Jewish heritage and promoting charitable giving to the Jewish community" and included Greg Grunberg, Marlee Matlin, Kevin Weisman, and Jonathan Silverman.

Personal life
In 1992, Malina met costume designer Melissa Merwin through his friendship with her sister Jennifer, and Jennifer's then-husband actor Timothy Busfield. Merwin converted to Judaism under Conservative auspices. They married in 1996 and have two children, Isabel and Avi.

Filmography

 A Few Good Men (1992) – Tom
 In the Line of Fire (1993) – Secret Service Agent Chavez
 Separate Lives (1995) – Randall
 The American President (1995) – David
 Sliders (1996) – Egghead Announcer
 From the Earth to the Moon (1998) – Tim Messick
 Bulworth (1998) – Bill Feldman
 Sports Night (1998–2000) – Jeremy Goodwin
 Kill the Man (1999) – Bob Stein
 How to Marry a Billionaire: A Christmas Tale (2000) – Mark Sickler
 Without Charlie (2001) – Charlie
 The West Wing (2002–2006) – Will Bailey (71 episodes)
 See Jane Date (2003) – Kevin Adams
 View from the Top (2003) – Randy Jones
 Big Shots (2007) – Karl Mixworthy (11 episodes)
 Numb3rs (2007) – Howard Meeks (episodes: "Nine Wives", "Democracy" and "Waste Not")
 Stargate SG-1 (2007) – Cicero (episode: "Bad Guys")
 Greys Anatomy (2008) – Seth Hammer (episode: "In the Midnight Hour")
 Medium (2008) – Tim Carmer (episode: "Car Trouble")
 CSI: Crime Scene Investigation (2008) – DA Monroe (episode: "Woulda, Coulda, Shoulda")
 Terminator: The Sarah Connor Chronicles (2009) – Agent Auldridge
 In Plain Sight (2009–2011) – Peter Alpert (17 episodes)
 iCarly (2009) – Unidentified Dingo Channel Writer
 Psych (2009) – Stewart Gimbley (episode: "Let's Get Hairy")
 House M.D. (2009) – Tucker (episode: "Wilson")
 Legally Mad (2009) – Aaron (unaired pilot)
 Bones (2010) – Dr. Adam Copeland (episode: "The Devil in the Details")
 The Good Guys (2010) – Assistant Chief James Guthrie
 The Big Bang Theory (2011–2019) – President Siebert (14 episodes)
 CSI: Miami (2011) – Neil Marshall (1 episode)
 Private Practice (2011) – Jason (episode: "To Change The Things We Can")
 American Horror Story: Murder House (2011) – The Dentist (episode: Spooky Little Girl)
 The First Time (2012) – Mr. Miller
 Leap Year (2012) – Sam Berry (3 episodes)
 Scandal (2012–2018) – David Rosen
 Law & Order: Special Victims Unit (2014) – Simon Wilkes (2 episodes)
 The Young Kieslowski (2014) – Robert Kieslowski
 Knights of Badassdom (2014) – Travis
 Extant (2014) – Dr. Gavin Beck (episode: "What on Earth Is Wrong?")
 Thrilling Adventure Hour Live (2015) – Barkeep
 Childrens Hospital (2015) – (episode: "We Are Not Our DNA!")
 Rules Don't Apply (2016) – Herb (uncredited)
 Wet Hot American Summer: Ten Years Later (2017) – Deep Throat (3 episodes)
White Boy Rick  (2018) Wayne County Sheriff Robert A. Ficano
 The Good Doctor (2019) – Mitchell Stewart (episode: "Take My Hand")
 Perfect Harmony (2020) – Torsten VanBlaricum (episode: "Know When to Walk Away")
 FBI: Most Wanted (2020) – Paul Hayden (episode: "Silkworm")
 Shameless (2020) – Officer Tipping (5 episodes)
 This Is Us (2021) – Car Crash Victim (episode: "There")
 The Rookie (2021) – Max (episode: "Life and Death")
 Inventing Anna (2022) – Henrick Knight (episode 2: "The Devil Wore Anna")

References

External links
 
 Photos from Wireimage

1966 births
20th-century American male actors
21st-century American male actors
American male film actors
American male stage actors
American male television actors
American people of Polish-Jewish descent
American podcasters
Horace Mann School alumni
Jewish American male actors
Living people
Male actors from New Rochelle, New York
Male actors from New York City
Yale University alumni
21st-century American Jews
20th-century American Jews